Tyler Austin Wells (born August 26, 1994) is an American professional baseball pitcher for the Baltimore Orioles of Major League Baseball (MLB). He made his MLB debut in 2021.

Amateur career
Wells attended University High School in Morgantown, West Virginia as a freshman and sophomore before transferring to Yucaipa High School in Yucaipa, California. As a junior in 2012, he went 8–0 with a 0.84 ERA. In 2013, as a senior, he had a 0.28 ERA. Undrafted out of high school in the 2013 Major League Baseball draft, Wells enrolled at California State University, San Bernardino where he played college baseball for the Coyotes.

In 2014, as a freshman at CSUSB, Wells appeared in 11 games (eight starts), going 1–5 with a 4.30 ERA, and as a sophomore in 2015, he went 2–4 with a 4.93 ERA in 12 starts. Wells broke out as a junior in 2016, pitching to a 4–7 record with a 2.84 ERA in 15 starts.

Professional career

Minnesota Twins organization

After the season, Wells was selected by the Minnesota Twins in the 15th round of the 2016 Major League Baseball draft.

Wells made his professional debut with the Elizabethton Twins, going 5–2 with a 3.23 ERA in ten starts. He spent 2017 with the Cedar Rapids Kernels, going 5–3 with a 3.11 ERA in 14 starts, and began 2018 with the Fort Myers Miracle where he was named a Florida State League All-Star before being promoted to the Chattanooga Lookouts in July, where he finished the season. In 22 games (21 starts) between the two clubs, Wells went 10–6 with a 2.49 ERA and a 0.96 WHIP.

Wells began 2019 with the Pensacola Blue Wahoos, but underwent Tommy John surgery in May, forcing him to miss the remainder of the season. Wells did not play a minor league game in 2020 due to the cancellation of the minor league season caused by the COVID-19 pandemic.

Baltimore Orioles
On December 10, 2020, Wells was selected by the Baltimore Orioles in the Rule 5 draft. In 2021, he made the Opening Day roster. On April 4, 2021, Wells made his MLB debut in relief against the Boston Red Sox, pitching a scoreless ninth inning. On June 2, Wells earned his first career major league victory, pitching three scoreless innings giving up only one hit against the Minnesota Twins. On September 5, Wells earned his first career save after pitching a perfect ninth inning in an 8-7 win over the New York Yankees. Wells missed time during the season due to wrist and shoulder injuries, but still pitched 57 innings in relief in which he went 2-3 with a 4.11 ERA and 65 strikeouts.

Wells began the 2022 season in Baltimore's starting rotation.

See also
Rule 5 draft results

References

External links

1994 births
Living people
Baltimore Orioles players
Baseball players from California
Chattanooga Lookouts players
Cal State San Bernardino Coyotes baseball players
Cedar Rapids Kernels players
Elizabethton Twins players
Fort Myers Miracle players
Gulf Coast Twins players
Major League Baseball pitchers
People from Yucaipa, California
Sportspeople from San Bernardino County, California